Austin McCollum (born 1990/1991) is a state legislator in Arkansas. He was first elected to the Arkansas House of Representatives in 2016 and in 2021 is Majority Leader for the Republican Party. He lives in Bentonville, Arkansas. He represents the 95th District and has sponsored several bills.

He graduated from the University of Tulsa.

References

1990s births
21st-century American politicians
Living people
Republican Party members of the Arkansas House of Representatives
People from Bentonville, Arkansas
University of Tulsa alumni